Wah-Tut-Ca Scout Reservation, in Northwood, Rockingham County, New Hampshire, on the shores of Northwood Lake, is a property owned by the Spirit of Adventure Council of the Boy Scouts of America.

Summer camps in New Hampshire
Buildings and structures in Rockingham County, New Hampshire
Local council camps of the Boy Scouts of America